The Marne di Monte Serrone ("Monte Serrone Marl") is a geological formation in Italy, dating to roughly between 181 and 178 million years ago, and covering the early and middle Toarcian stage of the Jurassic Period of central Italy. It is the regional equivalent to the Toarcian units of Spain such as the Turmiel Formation, units in Montenegro, such as the Budoš Limestone and units like the Wazzant Formation and the Azilal Formation of Morocco.

Description 
The Marne di Monte Serrone was first defined by Pialli in 1969.

The formation is characterised for be one of the most complete sections of the Toarcian paleobiographical strata around Europe. It is also one of the best places on southern Europe where the strata shows the effects of the Lower Toarcian anoxic event (TAE). The formation also provides data about the changes after the Toarcian AE, with changes on the deposited micritic limestones and marls, what shows a local sedimentary response to the Toarcian climatic perturbation induced by the Vulcanism of the Southern Karoo-Ferrar that boiled the carbon cycle and change the mechanism of Earth climate. The dawn after the Toarcian AE is presented locally by changes on the environments, to more seashore to lagoonal ones.

Depositional environment 
The environment of the formation has been compared to the present on the Toarcian Betic Cordillera strata, with a corridor of pelagic environments with influence from emerged reliefs. Other sections are related to nearby emerged lands, seashore deposits and even inland deposition, due to the changes in lithology (especially with the clay minerals kaolinite and smectite). Due to that, the main depositional layers of the formation are believed to come from an environment intermediate between pelagic and nearshore settings.

Due to the influence of different depositional settings, the lithology of the formation was widely distributed, with changes on the mineralological composition. The clay Mineral assemblages, with the neritic sedimentation, expose a change on the deposition, as it can be seen on the Valdorbia Section, where on the Middle Toarcian the reduction of this minerals indicate a sea-level fall, with a change from a bathyal to a middle shelf environment. Additionally there is a record of changes on the fauna, specially bivalves that suggests a variable flow regime at the major wave base as a result of a storm event.

Fossil content 
The biota of the formation comprise mostly marine microinvertebrates and algae, with the presence of ammonites and abundant pollen in the Middle Toarcian sections. Nanoplankton is one of the most representative finds of the layers, appearing deposited with interruptions, probably due to changes on the oxygen content of the sea floor. Phytoplankton includes abundant dinoflagellate cysts and acritarchs, specially the genus Micrhystridium. There registered a transgression on the sea level on the Lower Toarcian, with a rise, giving the Umbria-Marche Basin pelagic conditions, and a regression during the Middle Toarcian. Those changes implicate the disappearance of genera of dinoflagellates from the strata to be replaced with new ones. Some dinoflagellate genera such as Mendicodinium are more abundant in the Marne di Monte Serrone than in any other unit discovered until 1997.

Foraminiferal analysis had been done, revealing changes in the salinity, with Spirillina as the most abundant genus found, followed by Prodentalina, Eoguttulina, Lenticulina, Nodosaria, Lingulonodosaria and Pseudonodosaria. Invertebrate remains are mainly brachiopods (Pseudokingena, Nannirhynchia and Lokutella, among others) and ammonites; Eodactylites, Pleuroceras, Canavaria, Trinacrioceras, Lioceratoides, and Praepolyplectus as predominant genera.

Other marine fauna includes Holothuriidan Sclerites, unidentified crinoids, fragmentary asteroideans and fish teeth, similar to the genera Saurostomus and Dapedium.

There are terrestrial fossils and sediments, specially clay. The main source area for the clay could have been the palaeosoils developed on the Carbonate Latium-Abruzzo Platform, although more recent studies prove a continental origin. The Main fossils from terrestrial deposits are plant Pollen, mostly Pteridophyta spores and Circumpolles, and Palynomacerals. The genera includes Leptolepidites (Lycopsida) spp., Trilites (Filicopsida) spp., Ischyosporites (Pteridopsida) spp. or Foveosporites (Selaginellaceae) spp. and others less abundant, such as the genus Callialasporites (Coniferales).

There is a curious reduction of the Cheirolepidiaceae genus Classopollis, abundant on coeval associations from northern Europe, Portugal, northeast Italy and Israel, as a possible effect of paleoclimatic changes. In 2019 was recovered that Marne di Monte Serrone seashore section was part of the now lost continent of Greater Adria, with the confirmation of a continental origin for the plant matter, as was proposed in 1997.

See also 
 Azilal Group, North Africa
 Calcare di Sogno, Italy
 Mizur Formation, North Caucasus
 Cattamarra Coal Measures, Australia
 Djupadal Formation, Central Skane
 Ciechocinek Formation, Germany and Poland
 Irlbach Sandstone, Germany
 Fernie Formation, Alberta and British Columbia
 Poker Chip Shale
 Kandreho Formation, Madagascar
 Kota Formation, India
 Krempachy Marl Formation, Poland and Slovakia
 Lava Formation, Lithuania
 List of fossiliferous stratigraphic units in Italy
 Los Molles Formation, Argentina
 Mawson Formation, Antarctica
 Navajo Sandstone, Utah
 Posidonia Shale, Lagerstätte in Germany
 Saubach Formation, Austria
 Sachrang Formation, Austria
 Whitby Mudstone, England
 Whiteaves Formation, British Columbia
 :Category:Toarcian Stage

References

Bibliography 

  
 
 
 
 
 
 Palliani, R. B., & Riding, J. B. (1999). Relationships between the early Toarcian anoxic event and organic-walled phytoplankton in central Italy. Marine Micropaleontology, 37(2), 101-116
 Palliani, R. B., Cirilli, S., & Mattioli, E. (1998). Phytoplankton response and geochemical evidence of the lower Toarcian relative sea level rise in the Umbria-Marche basin (Central Italy). Palaeogeography, Palaeoclimatology, Palaeoecology, 142(1-2), 33–50.
 Palliani, R. B., Riding, J. B., & Torricelli, S. (1997). The dinoflagellate cyst Mendicodinium Morgenroth, 1970, emend. from the lower Toarcian (Jurassic) of central Italy. Review of Palaeobotany and Palynology, 96(1-2), 99-111
 Palliani, R. B., & Riding, J. B. (1997). Lower Toarcian palynostratigraphy of Pozzale, central Italy. Palynology, 21(1), 91-103.
 Palliani, R. B. (1997). Toarcian sporomorph assemblages from the Umbria‐Marche basin, central Italy. Palynology, 21(1), 105–121.
 Nini, C., Nocchi, M., & Venturi, F. (1996). The Toarcian marly-calcareous succession in the M. Martani area (Northern Apennines): lithostratigraphy, biostratigraphy, paleoecology and effects of Tethysian event on the depositional environment. BOLLETTINO-SOCIETA PALEONTOLOGICA ITALIANA, 35, 281–320.
 Monaco, P. (1994). Hummocky cross-stratifications and trace fossils in the Middle Toarcian of some sequences of Umbria-Marche Apennines. Geobios, 27, 679–688.
 Monaco, P., Nocchi, M., Ortega Huertas, M., Palomo, I., & Martínez, F. (1994). Depositional trends in the Valdorbia Section (Central Italy) during the Early Jurassic, as revealed by micropaleontology, sedimentology and geochemistry. Eclogae Geologicae Helvetiae, 87(1), 157-223
 Bucefalo Palliani, R., & Mattioli, E. (1994). Enrichment in organic matter within the Early Toarcian Marne di Monte Serrone Formation: a synchronous event in the Umbria-Marche Basin (central Italy). Paleopelagos, 4, 129–140.
 Noël, D., Busson, G., Cornée, A., & Manginin, A. M. (1993). Le nannoplancton calcaire et la formation des alternances calcaires-marnes dans le Lias des bassins de Marches-Ombrie (Italie). Rivista italiana di paleontologia e stratigrafia, 99(4).
 Ortega Huertas, M., Monaco, P., & Palomo, I. (1993). First Data on Clay Mineral Assemblages and Geochemical Characteristics of Toarcian Sedimentation in the umbriamarche basin (central Italy). Clay Minerals, 28(2), 297–310.
 Baldanza, A. (1989). The type section of Marne di Monte Serrone Formation: stratigraphic analysis based on ammonites, calcareous nannofossils and foraminifera assemblages. Mesozoic Cenozoic Stratigraphy in the Umbria-Marche Area. Mere. Descr. Carta Geol. Ital, 39, 185.
 Pialli, G. (1969). Un episodio marnoso del Lias superiore nel bacino umbro-marchigiano: le marne di M. Serrone. Stabilimento tipografico Genovese.

Geologic formations of Italy
Jurassic System of Europe
Toarcian Stage
Jurassic Italy
Marl formations
Open marine deposits
Fossiliferous stratigraphic units of Europe
Paleontology in Italy
Formations
Formations